Harmostes serratus is a species of scentless plant bug in the family Rhopalidae. It is found in Central America, North America, South America, and Mexico.

References

External links

 

Articles created by Qbugbot
Insects described in 1775
Taxa named by Johan Christian Fabricius
Rhopalinae
Hemiptera of North America
Hemiptera of Central America
Hemiptera of South America